The 15th Parliament of Antigua and Barbuda was elected on the 21st of March, 2018.

Members

Senate

House of Representatives

References 

Parliaments of Antigua and Barbuda